State Route 140 (SR 140) is a west-east state highway located entirely in Henry County in northwest Tennessee.

Route description
SR 140 begins at a junction with SR 22 within the city limits of McKezie in Henry County’s southwestern corner between the county’s western and southern boundaries with Weakley and Carroll Counties, respectively. SR 140 travels north to cross the East Fork of the Obion River and SR 54 at Como, and intersect SR 69 in the northwestern Henry County town of Cottage Grove. After a brief concurrency with SR 69, SR 140 turns due east to intersect and have a 575 feet concurrency with US 641 (SR 54) in Puryear, and ends at a junction with US 79 (SR 76) at Paris Landing State Park.

Major intersections

See also

References
Mileage retrieved from DeLorme Street Atlas USA 
Official Tennessee Highway Maps

External links
Tennessee Department of Transportation

140
140